Banca Popolare di Bari S.C.p.A. (BP Bari) is an Italian bank based in Bari, Apulia region. The bank covers most of mainland Italy (13 of 18 regions), except Piedmont and Liguria, and all the autonomous regions of Italy: Aosta Valley, Trentino – South Tyrol, Friuli – Venezia Giulia and the islands of Sardinia and Sicily.

As of 31 December 2016, BP Bari Group had 362 branches (101 branches in Abruzzo), with BP Bari itself having 308 branches in 11 regions. Subsidiary Cassa di Risparmio di Orvieto had 54 branches in 2015.

History
Banca Popolare di Bari was found in 1960 as a cooperative bank. The bank absorbed Banca Popolare della Penisola Sorrentina (based in Sorrento Peninsula), Banca Popolare di Calabria (based in Calabria) in the early 2000s. In 2001 it acquired Nuova Banca Mediterranea, a major bank in Basilicata (with branches from Campania and Apulia also). In 2004 Banca Mediterranea was also absorbed into BP Bari.

In 2014 BP Bari contributed the capital increases of Banca Tercas, which was under special administration by the state. After the transactions Banca Tercas and its subsidiary Banca Caripe, the major saving banks in Abruzzo, became subsidiaries of BP Bari.

In 2016 BP Bari partnered with Aviva in bancassurance for 5-year.

With the state guarantee (Garanzia sulla Cartolarizzazione delle Sofferenze) to senior tranche of the bad debt, BP Bari securitizated €800 million gross book value of non-performing loan. (in tranches of senior and junior loans) The bank also announced to absorb the two subsidiaries Tercas and Caripe, which only retained as brands.

On 1 June 2015 BP Bari received the assets and liabilities of Banca Popolare delle Province Calabre, which was in liquidation.

Shareholders
As a Popular Bank, there was a cap on individual's stake in the bank. Nuova Cassa di Risparmio di Ferrara (Nuova Carife) also owned 0.56151% shares, which was a relic of a cross-ownership between BP Bari and old Carife.

See also

 Banca Popolare di Puglia e Basilicata, an Italian bank based in Altamura, Apulia
 Banca Popolare Pugliese, an Italian bank based in Parabita, in the Province of Lecce, Apulia
 Banca Apulia, an Italian bank based in San Severo, in the Province of Foggia, Apulia, a subsidiary of Veneto Banca
 Banco di Napoli, an Italian bank serving southern Italy, a subsidiary of Intesa Sanpaolo

References

 Banca Carime, an Italian bank serving southern Italy, a defunct subsidiary of UBI Banca
 Banca di Roma, an Italian bank serving central and southern Italy, a defunct subsidiary of UniCredit
 Banca della Campania, a defunct subsidiary of Banca BPER
 Banca Cattolica di Molfetta, an Italian bank based in Molfetta, Apulia, a defunct subsidiary of Banca Antonveneta
 Banca Popolare del Mezzogiorno, a defunct subsidiary of Banca BPER

External links
  

Banks established in 1960
Italian companies established in 1960
Banks of Italy
Companies based in Apulia
Bari
Cooperative banks of Italy